"Mr. Vain" is a song by German musical group Culture Beat, released in April 1993 as the lead single from their second studio album, Serenity (1993). It was written by Steven Levis, Nosie Katzmann and Jay Supreme, and produced by Torsten Fenslau. Tania Evans is the lead vocalist and Supreme is the rapper. The song achieved huge success worldwide, reaching the number-one position in at least 13 countries. In the United States, it peaked at number 15 on the Cash Box Top 100, number 17 on the Billboard Hot 100 and number two on the Billboard Dance Club Songs chart. In 1994, the song earned an award at the German Echo Award, in the category for "Best International Dance Single" and an award in the category for "Best Hi-NRG 12-inch" at the WMC International Dance Music Awards in the US.

Background
German DJ an producer Torsten Fenslau and his friend Jens Zimmerman formed Culture Beat in Frankfurt in 1989. They took the name from the idea of trying to mix high culture and music, and had their first hit same year, entitled "Der Erdbeermund" ("Strawberry Lips"), which meshed house sounds with the poetry of 15th century French writer François Villon. With the success of songs like "Rhythm Is a Dancer" by German group Snap! in 1992, which several critics later would compare "Mr. Vain" to, the formula for what would be known as 90s Eurodance was now beginning to establish. Fenslau wanted to develop the group further and American rapper Jay Supreme and British singer Tania Evans were recruited to front a new single and album. Supreme had moved to Germany after being in the US Army, while Evans had been working as backing singer for Neneh Cherry. The lyrics to "Mr. Vain" was written by German musician and songwriter Nosie Katzmann with Supreme and Steven Lewis, and the single was released on April 16, 1993.

Chart performance
"Mr. Vain" was one of the best-selling singles across Europe of 1993. It first broke in Germany, topping the German singles chart for nine weeks before breaking more widely through the summer. The song also topped the charts in Austria, Belgium, Denmark, Finland, Ireland, Italy, the Netherlands, Norway, Switzerland and the United Kingdom, as well as on the Eurochart Hot 100. In the UK, the song hit the top spot during its fourth week on the UK Singles Chart, on 22 August 1993, and was the first single to top the chart that was not released on 7-inch vinyl. The single spent four weeks at the top of the chart and sold over 442,000 copies in the UK. 

Outside Europe, it peaked at number-one in Australia, on the RPM Dance/Urban chart in Canada and in Zimbabwe. In the United States, the single reached number 15 on the Cash Box Top 100 and number 17 on the Billboard Hot 100, earning a gold certification by the Recording Industry Association of America (RIAA). "Mr. Vain" also peaked at number two for two weeks on the Billboard Dance Club Songs chart. It charted also in Japan. The song also earned a gold record in Austria, the Netherlands, Sweden, Switzerland and the UK, while it received a silver record in France. It was also awarded a 3× gold record in Germany, with a sale of 750,000 units, and a platinum record in Australia and Norway.

Critical reception
AllMusic editor William Cooper called "Mr. Vain" an "engaging house tune". He compared it to Snap!'s "Rhythm Is a Dancer" and Real McCoy's "Another Night" with its "instantly memorable keyboard hook". Larry Flick from Billboard described it as a "chirpy rave/NRG track", stating that "if its European chart success is a fair indicator", then the song "will be all the rage within minutes." Nicole Leedham from The Canberra Times noted Culture Beat's "combination of soul, insightful lyrics and dance floor-friendly music". Student newspaper Columbia Daily Spectator stated that "near-indiscernible rapping over a pulsing techno beat and an unforgettable synth line" make it "the quintessential '90s dance track." Tom Ewing of Freaky Trigger wrote that "Mr. Vain" "heads straight for the dark heart of the club, sketching a dancefloor predator who – like Eezer Goode  – is as much metaphor as character. For drugs, lust, loss of control – who knows? The lyrics' almost-there English works to the song's benefit – there's an awkward poetry to "Call him Mr Raider, call him Mr Wrong" – and for once the obligatory rap isn't an embarrassment, with Jay Supreme's gloating, bassy flow reminding me of knowingly devilish Chicago house classics like "Your Only Friend". "Mr Vain" is the hustling flipside to "All That She Wants", and almost as good a pop record." 

John Patrick from Lake District News stated, "The beat is a dream to any dance and the words become so familiar, you can sing along with the chorus on cue." James Masterton said in his weekly UK chart commentary, "Stand by for the dance hit of the summer." He added that "although in actual fact as one of the best European dance records of the year so far it would probably have been a major hit anyway." Diana Valois from The Morning Call noted its "formula of staccato beats, deep bass lines, and nervous and tinny keyboard riffs." She added, "Balancing the somber vocals of Jay Supreme is the optimistic soulfulness of a cheery Tania Evans". Machgiel Bakker from Music & Media viewed it as a "snappy and poppy dance groove". Alan Jones from Music Week declared the song as "maddeningly commercial but lyrically nonsensical", and with "hugely commercial hooks". Jim Farber from New York Daily News described it as "propulsive", with "snappy electronic rhythms and trendy rap break". He commented, "Musically, the song strongly recalls Snap's smash "Rhythm Is a Dancer", but its clash of two voices offers a fresh twist. One voice (provided by R&B singer Tania Evans) mockingly describes the ace narcissist "Mr. Vain", while a second (from a rapper named Jay Supreme) embodies the title character's selfish desire – it's a winkling comment on self-absorption on a track made for the indulgent world of dance clubs." In an retrospective review, Pop Rescue called it "fantastically catchy".

Music video
A music video was produced to promote the single, directed by Swedish-based director Matt Broadley. It begins with Supreme in black-and-white, looking at himself in a mirror, putting on a ring. As he looks into the mirror again, he sees the cracks in his face. He then attends a house party. Now in colours, people are dancing at the party. Evans sits in the corner of the room and sees Supreme peeking by the curtain. He walks towards her and offers her his hand. She leaves, with him following her down the hallway. As the video ends, she takes a hand-mirror lying on a nightstand and puts it up to his face. In black-and-white, his face becomes cracked and chipped again. The video received heavy rotation on MTV Europe in July 1993. Broadley would also be directing the videos for "Anything" and "World in Your Hands".

Impact and legacy
The German Echo Award honored the song with an award in the category for "Best International Dance Single" in 1994. Same year, it also received an award in the category for "Best Hi-NRG 12{{}}" at the WMC International Dance Music Awards in the US.

MTV Dance ranked "Mr. Vain" number 65 in their list of "The 100 Biggest 90's Dance Anthems of All Time" in November 2011.The Guardian picked "Mr. Vain" in their "Sounds of Germany: a history of German pop in 10 songs" in 2012. They wrote, "Culture Beat's glorious Mr Vain, with its rollicking beat, diva vocals and stilted rapping, comes as close as anything to summarising the spirit of the genre."

Australian music channel Max placed "Mr. Vain" at number 732 in their list of "1000 Greatest Songs of All Time" in 2012.

In their "The ABC in Eurodance" in 2016, Finnish broadcaster Yle noted, "If someone could look up "The archetypal Eurodance hit song" in an Encyclopedia there would probably be a link to an audio file for "Mr Vain" - a song that more than anyone else came to define the 90's dance music."BuzzFeed'' listed the song number 17 in their "The 101 Greatest Dance Songs Of the '90s" list in 2017.

Track listing and formats

CD maxi single (Germany, 1993)
"Mr. Vain" (Vain Mix) – 6:35
"Mr. Vain" (Decent Mix) – 7:05
"Mr. Vain" (Special Radio Edit) – 4:17

CD maxi single – Remix (Germany, 1993)
"Mr. Vain" (Mr. House) – 6:18
 Remixed by Doug Laurent
"Mr. Vain" (Mr. Rave) – 6:42
 Remixed by Doug Laurent
"Mr. Vain" (Mr. Trance) – 6:20
 Remixed by Doug Laurent
"Mr. Vain" (Mr. Hardcore) – 6:37
 Remixed by Doug Laurent

CD maxi single (United States, 1993)
"Mr. Vain" (Radio Edit) – 4:17
"Mr. Vain" (Intense Radio Edit) – 3:52
"Mr. Vain" (Vain Mix) – 6:35
"Mr. Vain" (Mr. Intense) – 5:28
"Mr. Vain" (Mr. Hardcore) – 6:38
 Remixed by Doug Laurent

12-inch vinyl single (US, 1993)
"Mr. Vain" (Vain Mix) – 6:35
"Mr. Vain" (Mr. Club) – 6:39
"Mr. Vain" (Mr. Intense) – 5:28
"Mr. Vain" (Mr. Liebrand) – 5:40
"Mr. Vain" (Mr. Hardcore) – 6:38

Cassette single (US, 1993)
"Mr. Vain" (Radio Edit) – 4:17
"Mr. Vain" (Radio Edit) (w/o Rap) – 4:17

CD single – Promo (US, 1993)
"Mr. Vain" (Lone Star Edit) – 3:30

CD maxi single – (United Kingdom, 1993)
"Mr. Vain" (Special Radio Edit) – 4:17
"Mr. Vain" (Vain Mix) – 6:35
"(Cherry Lips) Der Erdbeermund" (Single Version) – 4:05
"I Like You" (Single Version) – 3:58

CD maxi single – Remix (Japan, 1996)
"Mr. Vain" (FM 802 Rock Kids 802 Mix) – 4:25
"Mr. Vain" (Hyper Rave Mix) – 5:32
"Mr. Vain" (Tribal Mix) – 4:47
"Anything" – 6:26
"Mr. Vain" (Album Version) – 5:39
"Culture Beat Mega Mix" – 6:38

Charts and certifications

Weekly charts

Original version

1 Mr. Vain Remix! (Japanese mini album)

2 Remix

"Mr. Vain Recall" version

Year-end charts

Certifications

Release history

Covers and samples
One of the song's original writers, Nosie Katzmann, recorded a new country version of the song.

See also
List of Dutch Top 40 number-one singles of 1993
List of European number-one hits of 1993
List of number-one hits of 1993 (Austria)
List of number-one hits of 1993 (Germany)
List of number-one hits of 1993 (Italy)
List of number-one singles of 1993 (Ireland)
List of number-one singles in Australia during the 1990s
List of number-one singles of the 1990s (Switzerland)
List of RPM number-one dance singles of 1993
List of UK Singles Chart number ones of the 1990s
VG-lista 1964 to 1994
VRT Top 30 number-one hits of 1993

References

1993 singles
1993 songs
Culture Beat songs
Dance Pool singles
Dutch Top 40 number-one singles
English-language German songs
Epic Records singles
European Hot 100 Singles number-one singles
Irish Singles Chart number-one singles
Music videos directed by Matt Broadley
Music Week number-one dance singles
Number-one singles in Australia
Number-one singles in Austria
Number-one singles in Denmark
Number-one singles in Finland
Number-one singles in Germany
Number-one singles in Italy
Number-one singles in Norway
Number-one singles in Switzerland
Number-one singles in Zimbabwe
Songs written by Jay Supreme
Songs written by Nosie Katzmann
UK Singles Chart number-one singles
Ultratop 50 Singles (Flanders) number-one singles